In mathematics, Wilson polynomials are a family of orthogonal polynomials introduced by 
that generalize Jacobi polynomials, Hahn polynomials, and Charlier polynomials. 

They are defined in terms of the generalized hypergeometric function and the Pochhammer symbols by

See also
Askey–Wilson polynomials are a q-analogue of Wilson polynomials.

References

Hypergeometric functions
Orthogonal polynomials